OCSC may refer to:
 Orange County SC, an American professional soccer club in Orange County, California
 Orlando City SC (2010–2014), an American professional soccer club in Orlando, Florida, that played in the USL Pro league
 Orlando City SC, an American professional soccer club in Orlando, Florida, a Major League Soccer (MLS) franchise
 OCSC Sailing
 The Oxford Companion to Spirits & Cocktails, an Oxford University Press publication